Vishram Prasad (born 1 July 1923) was an Indian politician. He was elected to the Lok Sabha, the lower house of the Parliament of India from the Lalganj constituency of Uttar Pradesh as a member of the Praja Socialist Party.

References

External links
Official biographical sketch in Parliament of India website

1923 births
Possibly living people
Praja Socialist Party politicians
Lok Sabha members from Uttar Pradesh
India MPs 1962–1967
Politicians from Varanasi